Tyumen Railway Station is the primary passenger railway station for the city of Tyumen in Russia, and an important stop along the Trans-Siberian Railway.

Destinations

Major Domestic Routes 
 Moscow — Vladivostok
 Moscow  — Tomsk
 Moscow — Barnaul
 Moscow — Khabarovsk
 Saint Petersburg — Tyumen
 Moscow — Ulan Ude
 Adler — Irkutsk
 Adler — Chita

International

References

Railway stations in Tyumen Oblast
Trans-Siberian Railway
Railway stations in the Russian Empire opened in 1885
1885 establishments in the Russian Empire